Harawacha is a town located in the East Hararghe Zone of the Oromia, Ethiopia. It is one the town of the  Malka Balo District.

Notes 

Populated places in the Oromia Region